The is a grammatical article in English, denoting persons or things already mentioned, under discussion, implied or otherwise presumed familiar to listeners, readers, or speakers. It is the definite article in English. The is the most frequently used word in the English language; studies and analyses of texts have found it to account for seven percent of all printed English-language words. It is derived from gendered articles in Old English which combined in Middle English and now has a single form used with pronouns of any gender. The word can be used with both singular and plural nouns, and with a noun that starts with any letter. This is different from many other languages, which have different forms of the definite article for different genders or numbers.

Pronunciation 

Modern American and New Zealand English have an increasing tendency to limit usage of  pronunciation and use , even before a vowel.

Sometimes the word "the" is pronounced , with stress, to emphasise that something is unique: "he is the expert", not just "an" expert in a field.

Adverbial 

Definite article principles in English are described under "Use of articles". The, as in phrases like "the more the better", has a distinct origin and etymology and by chance has evolved to be identical to the definite article.

Article
The and that are common developments from the same Old English system. Old English had a definite article se (in the masculine gender), sēo (feminine), and þæt (neuter). In Middle English, these had all merged into þe, the ancestor of the Modern English word the.

Geographic usage
An area in which the use or non-use of the is sometimes problematic is with geographic names:
notable natural landmarks – rivers, seas, mountain ranges, deserts, island groups (archipelagoes) and so on – are generally used with a "the" definite article (the Rhine, the North Sea, the Alps, the Sahara, the Hebrides). 
continents, individual islands, administrative units and settlements mostly do not take a "the" article (Europe, Jura, Austria (but the Republic of Austria), Scandinavia, Yorkshire (but the County of York), Madrid). 
beginning with a common noun followed by of may take the article, as in the Isle of Wight or the Isle of Portland (compare Christmas Island), same applies to names of institutions: Cambridge University, but the University of Cambridge.
Some place names include an article, such as the Bronx, The Oaks, The Rock, The Birches, The Harrow, The Rower, The Swan, The Valley, The Farrington, The Quarter, The Plains, The Dalles, The Forks, The Village, The Village (NJ), The Village (OK), The Villages, The Village at Castle Pines, The Woodlands, The Pas, the Vatican, The Hyde, the West End, the East End, The Hague, or the City of London (but London). Formerly e.g. Bath, Devizes or White Plains.
generally described singular names, the North Island (New Zealand) or the West Country (England), take an article.

Countries and territorial regions are notably mixed, most exclude "the" but there are some that adhere to secondary rules:
 derivations from collective common nouns such as "kingdom", "republic", "union", etc.: the Central African Republic, the Dominican Republic, the United States, the United Kingdom, the Soviet Union, the United Arab Emirates, including most country full names: the Czech Republic (but Czechia), the Russian Federation (but Russia), the Principality of Monaco (but Monaco), the State of Israel (but Israel) and the Commonwealth of Australia (but Australia).
 countries in a plural noun: the Netherlands, the Falkland Islands, the Faroe Islands, the Cayman Islands, the Philippines, the Comoros, the Maldives, the Seychelles, Saint Vincent and the Grenadines, and the Bahamas.
Singular derivations from "island" or "land" that hold administrative rights – Greenland, England, Christmas Island and Norfolk Island – do not take a "the" definite article. 
 derivations from mountain ranges, rivers, deserts, etc., are sometimes used with an article, even for singular (the Lebanon, the Sudan, the Yukon,  the Congo). This usage is in decline, The Gambia remains recommended whereas use of the Argentine for Argentina is considered old-fashioned. Ukraine is occasionally referred to as the Ukraine, a usage that was common during the 20th century and during Soviet rule, but this is considered incorrect and possibly offensive in modern usage. Sudan (but the Republic of the Sudan) and South Sudan (but the Republic of South Sudan) are written nowadays without the article.

Ye form 
 
In Middle English, the (þe) was frequently abbreviated as a þ with a small e above it, similar to the abbreviation for that, which was a þ with a small t above it. During the latter Middle English and Early Modern English periods, the letter thorn (þ) in its common script, or cursive, form came to resemble a y shape. One major reason for this was that  existed in the printer's types that William Caxton and his contemporaries  imported from Belgium and the Netherlands, while  did not. As a result, the use of a y with an e above it as an abbreviation became common. It can still be seen in reprints of the 1611 edition of the King James Version of the Bible in places such as Romans 15:29 or in the Mayflower Compact. Historically, the article was never pronounced with a y sound even when it was so written.

Trademark
Ohio State University registered a trademark allowing the university to use "THE" on casual and athletic clothing. The university, often referred to as "The Ohio State University", had used "THE" on clothing since 2005, but took steps to register the trademark in August 2019 after the Marc Jacobs company attempted to do the same. In August 2021 Ohio State and Marc Jacobs agreed the high-end fashion retailer could use "THE" on its merchandise, which was different from what the university would sell. Still, the university took almost an additional year to convince the United States Patent and Trademark Office that the use of "the" was "more than ... ornamental".

Abbreviations

Since "the" is one of the most frequently used words in English, at various times short abbreviations for it have been found:

Barred thorn: the earliest abbreviation, it is used in manuscripts in the Old English language. It is the letter þ with a bold horizontal stroke through the ascender, and it represents the word þæt, meaning "the" or "that" (neuter nom. / acc.).
þͤ and þͭ (þ with a superscript e or t) appear in Middle English manuscripts for "þe" and "þat" respectively.
yͤ and yͭ are developed from þͤ and þͭ and appear in Early Modern manuscripts and in print (see Ye form).

Occasional proposals have been made by individuals for an abbreviation.  In 1916, Legros & Grant included in their classic printers' handbook Typographical Printing-Surfaces, a proposal for a letter similar to Ħ to represent "Th", thus abbreviating "the" to ħe.

In Middle English, the (þe) was frequently abbreviated as a þ with a small e above it, similar to the abbreviation for that, which was a þ with a small t above it. During the latter Middle English and Early Modern English periods, the letter thorn (þ) in its common script, or cursive form, came to resemble a y shape. As a result, the use of a y with an e above it as an abbreviation became common. This can still be seen in reprints of the 1611 edition of the King James Version of the Bible in places such as Romans 15:29, or in the Mayflower Compact. Historically, the article was never pronounced with a y sound, even when so written.

The word "The" itself, capitalised, is used as an abbreviation in Commonwealth countries for the honorific title "The Right Honourable", as in e.g. "The Earl Mountbatten of Burma", short for "The Right Honourable Earl Mountbatten of Burma", or "The Prince Charles".

Notes

References

External links
The – Merriam-Webster

English grammar
English words